Meabe is a surname. Notable people with the surname include:
Aitor Albizua Meabe (born 1992), Spanish journalist
Enrique Guerrikagoitia Meabe (born 1967), Spanish racing cyclist
Josefina Angélica Meabe (1939-2023), Argentine politician
Miren Agur Meabe (born 1962), Basque poet